The 1938–39 Sussex County Football League season was the 19th in the history of the competition.

League table
The league featured 14 clubs which competed in the last season, no new clubs joined the league this season.
Littlehampton added Town to the club name.

League table

References

1938-39
9